Ozwathini is a town in Ilembe District Municipality in the KwaZulu-Natal province of South Africa.

Appelsbosch hospital is located in this town.

References

Populated places in the Ndwedwe Local Municipality